Rachel Winter is a film producer. Winter and her fellow producers were nominated for an Academy Award for Best Picture for the 2013 film Dallas Buyers Club. In 2015, she co-founded RainMaker Films with producers Clay Pecorin, Russell Geyser, Chris Robert, and Corey DeSalvo. RainMaker, which is producing and/or financing multiple projects, recently expanded its repertoire and bolstered project development across a range of genres including suspense, fantasy, and sci-fi material.

Filmography 
 Wayward Son (1999)
 Long Lost Son (2006)
 Brooklyn Rules (2007)
 Dallas Buyers Club (2013)
 Stealing Cars (2015)
 Krystal (2017)
 The Space Between (2021) (director/producer)

References

External links

American film producers
Living people
Year of birth missing (living people)
Place of birth missing (living people)